The Hurdy Gurdy Man is the sixth studio album (seventh overall) by Scottish singer-songwriter Donovan. It was released in the US in October 1968 (Epic Records BN 26420 (stereo)), but not in the UK, because of a continuing contractual dispute that also prevented Sunshine Superman and Mellow Yellow from being released there. A songbook of lead sheets to the album was nonetheless issued in both countries.

History
Donovan wrote and recorded much of The Hurdy Gurdy Man in late 1967, not long after recording the songs that would form A Gift from a Flower to a Garden. The rest of The Hurdy Gurdy Man was recorded in April 1968, after he visited Rishikesh in India to study Transcendental Meditation under Maharishi Mahesh Yogi. John Lennon, Cynthia Lennon, George Harrison, Pattie Boyd, Paul McCartney, Jane Asher, Ringo Starr, Mia Farrow, Prudence Farrow and Mike Love were there as well. Harrison wrote a verse for "Hurdy Gurdy Man" when they were in India, but it was cut from the studio version in order to ensure that the song was not overly long for a single. On his 1973 live album Live in Japan: Spring Tour 1973 and his 1990 live album Rising, Donovan explains the story and sings the previously omitted verse. The last verse of "Hurdy Gurdy Man", written by Harrison, is: "When the truth gets buried deep / Beneath a thousand years of sleep / Time demands a turn around / And once again the truth is found".

Donovan's songwriting for The Hurdy Gurdy Man centered on drones on such songs as "Peregrine", "The River Song" and "Tangier" - the latter two being compositions by his friend "Gypsy Dave" (Gyp Mills) - and pop music on most of the other tracks. "As I Recall It" continued Donovan's infatuation with jazz. "Jennifer Juniper" and "Hurdy Gurdy Man" were both released as singles well before the album was released.

The recording sessions for the album are purported to have included future Led Zeppelin members Jimmy Page and John Paul Jones. Page was in The Yardbirds at the time and was actively looking to rebuild that band. The album credits John Bonham for percussion on the song "Hurdy Gurdy Man" and Clem Cattini as the drummer.

Reissues
On 25 October 1990, Epic Records reissued The Hurdy Gurdy Man (Epic 26420) on CD in the US.
On 24 October 1994, EMI released Four Donovan Originals (EMI 7243 8 30867 2 6) in the UK. Four Donovan Originals is a CD box set containing four Donovan albums that were not previously released in the UK. The Hurdy Gurdy Man is disc three of that set.
On 24 May 2005, EMI reissued The Hurdy Gurdy Man (EMI 8735682) on CD in the UK with seven bonus tracks.
In May 2013, Sundazed reissued The Hurdy Gurdy Man in its rare 1968 mono mix configuration, previously only available as a radio promo LP. 
On 1 October 2018, The state51 Conspiracy reissued The Hurdy Gurdy Man (CON235LP) on LP in the UK and Ireland.

Track listing

Original album (US) on LP
All tracks credited to Donovan Leitch. According to BMI, "A Sunny Day" and "The River Song" were collaborations with David J. Mills, but "Tangier" was written solely by Mills under its original title of "In Tangier Down a Windy Street".

Side one
"Hurdy Gurdy Man" – 3:13
"Peregrine" – 3:34
"The Entertaining of a Shy Girl" – 1:39
"As I Recall It" – 2:06
"Get Thy Bearings" – 2:47
"Hi It's Been a Long Time" – 2:32
"West Indian Lady" – 2:15

Side two
"Jennifer Juniper" – 2:40
"The River Song" – 2:14
"Tangier" – 4:10
"A Sunny Day" – 1:52
"The Sun is a Very Magic Fellow" – 2:42
"Teas" – 2:29

2005 CD (EMI, UK) bonus tracks
All tracks by Donovan Leitch.
"Teen Angel"
"Poor Cow"
"Laléna"
"Aye My Love"
"What a Beautiful Creature You Are" (Duet with Lulu)
"Colours"
"Catch the Wind"

Cover versions

 King Crimson played "Get Thy Bearings" live in 1969 and '71. The song was primarily used as a launching pad for extended improvisation. While Boz Burrell kept close to the original words during 1971, Greg Lake took some liberties with the lyrics in 1969. A recording of King Crimson performing the song, on 7 September 1969 at the Chesterfield Jazz Club, was released on disc two of The 21st Century Guide to King Crimson – Volume One – 1969–1974.
 American rock band the Butthole Surfers recorded a version of "Hurdy Gurdy Man" on their 1991 album Pioughd.
 L.A. Guns covered "Hurdy Gurdy Man" for their 2004 album Rips the Covers Off.
Steve Hillage covered "Hurdy Gurdy Man" on his progressive rock album L in 1976, backed by Todd Rundgren's Utopia and produced by Rundgren.

References

External links
 The Hurdy Gurdy Man - Donovan Unofficial Site

1968 albums
Donovan albums
Albums produced by Mickie Most
Epic Records albums